Mount Remus is a  mountain summit located in the Little Elbow River Valley of Kananaskis Country in the Canadian Rockies of Alberta, Canada. The mountain is named for Remus, who along with his twin brother Romulus were the mythological founders of Ancient Rome. The name was officially adopted by the Geographical Names Board of Canada in 1940. Mount Remus' nearest higher peak is Mount Romulus,  to the west-southwest.


Geology
Mount Remus is composed of sedimentary rock laid down during the Precambrian to Jurassic periods. Formed in shallow seas, this sedimentary rock was pushed east and over the top of younger rock during the Laramide orogeny.

Climate
Based on the Köppen climate classification, Mount Remus is located in a subarctic climate with cold, snowy winters, and mild summers. Precipitation runoff from the mountain drains into the Little Elbow River, which is a tributary of the Elbow River.

See also
List of mountains in the Canadian Rockies
Geology of Alberta

References

External links
 Mount Remus weather web site: Mountain Forecast

Two-thousanders of Alberta
Alberta's Rockies